Simon Manyonda (born 1986) is a British actor.

Early life
Manyonda was born in Lambeth, London, the eldest son of a GP of medicine and a gynaecologist and obstetrician. He is of South African and Zimbabwean descent. Manyonda is the elder brother of two siblings.

Filmography

Film

Television

Stage

Shorts

Audio

Video games

Awards
Manyonda earned an Ian Charleson Award Commendation for his 2012 portrayal of Lucius in Julius Caesar at the Royal Shakespeare Company.

References

External links
 
 Simon Manyonda at Curtis Brown (literary agents)
 Simon Manyonda at BroadwayWorld
 Simon Manyonda at AboutTheArtists: Every Theatre Credit Ever

Living people
1986 births
20th-century English male actors
21st-century English male actors
Alumni of the London Academy of Music and Dramatic Art
Black British male actors
English male film actors
English male radio actors
English male stage actors
English male television actors
English male voice actors
Male actors from London
People from the London Borough of Lambeth
English people of South African descent
English people of Zimbabwean descent